HTTP 403 is an HTTP status code meaning access to the requested resource is forbidden. The server understood the request, but will not fulfill it.

Specifications 
HTTP 403 provides a distinct error case from HTTP 401; while HTTP 401 is returned when the client has not authenticated, and implies that a successful response may be returned following valid authentication, HTTP 403 is returned when the client is not permitted access to the resource despite providing authentication such as insufficient permissions of the authenticated account.

Error 403: "The server understood the request, but is refusing to authorize it." (RFC 7231)

Error 401: "The request requires user authentication. The response MUST include a WWW-Authenticate header field (section 14.47) containing a challenge applicable to the requested resource. The client MAY repeat the request with a suitable Authorization header field (section 14.8). If the request already included Authorization credentials, then the 401 response indicates that authorization has been refused for those credentials." (RFC 2616)

The Apache web server returns 403 Forbidden in response to requests for URL paths that corresponded to file system directories when directory listings have been disabled in the server and there is no Directory Index directive to specify an existing file to be returned to the browser. Some administrators configure the Mod proxy extension to Apache to block such requests and this will also return 403 Forbidden. Microsoft IIS responds in the same way when directory list
ings are denied in that server. In WebDAV, the 403 Forbidden response will be returned by the server if the client issued a PROPFIND request but did not also issue the required Depth header or issued a Depth header of infinity.

Substatus error codes for IIS 

The following nonstandard codes are returned by Microsoft's Internet Information Services, and are not officially recognized by IANA.

 403.1 – Execute access forbidden
 403.2 – Read access forbidden
 403.3 – Write access forbidden
 403.4 – SSL required
 403.5 – SSL 128 required
 403.6 – IP address rejected
 403.7 – Client certificate required
 403.8 – Site access denied
 403.9 – Too many users
 403.10 – Invalid configuration
 403.11 – Password change
 403.12 – Mapper denied access
 403.13 – Client certificate revoked
 403.14 – Directory listing denied
 403.15 – Client Access Licenses exceeded
 403.16 – Client certificate is untrusted or invalid
 403.17 – Client certificate has expired or is not yet valid
 403.18 – Cannot execute request from that application pool
 403.19 – Cannot execute CGIs for the client in this application pool
 403.20 – Passport logon failed
 403.21 – Source access denied
 403.22 – Infinite depth is denied
 403.502 – Too many requests from the same client IP; Dynamic IP Restriction limit reached
 403.503 – Rejected due to IP address restriction

See also 

 List of HTTP status codes
 URL redirection

Notes

References

External links
 Apache Module mod_proxy – Forward 
 Working with SELinux Contexts Labeling files
 Hypertext Transfer Protocol (HTTP/1.1): Semantics and Content

Computer error messages
Hypertext Transfer Protocol status codes